The Cat Who...  is a series of twenty-nine mystery novels and three related collections by Lilian Jackson Braun and published by G. P. Putnam's Sons, featuring a reporter named Jim Qwilleran and his Siamese cats, Kao K'o-Kung (Koko for short) and Yum Yum. The first was written in 1966, with two more following in 1967 and 1968. The fourth appeared eighteen years later, after which at least one new novel was published every year until 2007. A thirtieth novel, originally announced for 2008, was postponed indefinitely by its publisher and then canceled after the author's death in 2011. It remains unpublished.

Main characters
James Mackintosh Qwilleran, or Qwill as his friends call him, is the main human character in the books. Qwilleran (Qwill to his friends) is a man who goes from late forties to mid fifties over the course of the series. He is often described as looking melancholy or brooding, but he is witty and enjoyable company. His most distinguishing feature is his "luxuriant moustache."

"Kao K’o-Kung" is the full name of the Siamese cat who is almost always referred to as Koko. He is named after a 13th-century Chinese artist whose name is usually written in modern Pinyin as Gao Kegong. He has the appearance of a prize-winning show-cat and an obstinate attitude toward anything he does not like.

Yum Yum is also Siamese, and had a troubled past. Yum Yum is named after a character in the opera The Mikado by Gilbert and Sullivan who is also the ward of a man named Ko-Ko. Yum Yum is described as being smaller than Koko, and far more affectionate. Her beautiful violet-blue eyes are slightly crossed.

Novels

Related Works by Lilian Jackson Braun

The Cat Who Had 14 Tales, 1988: an anthology of unrelated short stories involving various cats. Note that Qwilleran, Koko and Yum Yum do not appear in these tales.
Short and Tall Tales: Moose County Legends Collected by James Mackintosh Qwilleran, 2002: collected anecdotes and regional folklore from residents of Pickax & environs
The Private Life of the Cat Who ...: Tales of Koko and Yum Yum (from the Journals of James Mackintosh Qwilleran), 2004: collection of extracts from several previous works with limited new material

Related Works by Other Authors

The Cat Who... Companion, 1998 by Sharon A. Feaster, including Braun interview
The Cat Who... Quiz Book, 2003 by Robert J. Headrick, Jr., with introduction by Braun
The Cat Who... Cookbook, 2000 by Julie Murphy and Sally Abney Stempinski, with foreword by Braun
The Cat Who... Reunion Cookbook, 2006 by Julie Murphy and Sally Abney Stempinski, with foreword by Braun
The Cat Who Killed Lilian Jackson Braun, 2003, a parody novel by Robert Kaplow

See also

List of fictional cats in literature
The Cat Who Came for Christmas, an unrelated 1987 memoir by Cleveland Amory
The Cat Who Walks Through Walls, an unrelated 1985 novel by Robert A. Heinlein

References

External links
 

 
Novel series
Book series introduced in 1966

fr:Lilian Jackson Braun